Froment-Meurice is a surname. Notable people with the surname include:

François-Désiré Froment-Meurice (1802-1855), French goldsmith
Henri Froment-Meurice (1923-2018), French diplomat
Marc Froment-Meurice (born 1953), French philosopher
Froment-Meurice (golfer), French Olympic golfer (1900 Olympics)

See also
Froment
Meurice (disambiguation)

Compound surnames
French-language surnames